Krzewina  is a village in the administrative district of Gmina Bogatynia, within Zgorzelec County, Lower Silesian Voivodeship, in south-western Poland, close to the Czech and German borders.

Krzewina has a railway station, called Krzewina Zgorzelecka, which is currently serviced by the Ostdeutsche Eisenbahn OE 65 service to Görlitz, Cottbus and Zittau, all in Germany. It is located outside the village and mainly serves the German town of Ostritz, which is just across the river. Polish State Railways have withdrawn their passenger services from this station.

Gallery

References

Krzewina